Alona Tal (born ) is an Israeli actress and singer. She is known for her roles in Veronica Mars as cheerleader Meg Manning, in Supernatural as budding monster hunter Jo Harvelle, as Sonya Lebedenko in the final season of Burn Notice, and in SEAL Team as grad student Stella Baxter.

Early life
Tal was born and raised in Herzliya, Israel. Her father Ami Tal is a computer professional of Sephardic Jewish (Turkish-Jewish) descent, whose original surname was "Mizrahi". Her mother Ayala (née Sabat) is a lawyer and is of Ashkenazi Jewish (Polish-Jewish) descent. Both her parents were born in Israel. Her parents divorced when she was 9. She has two sisters as well as two half-sisters from her father's later relationship. She attended the Thelma Yellin High School in Givatayim, Israel, majoring in theatre. She is Jewish and has described herself as a "spiritual person". She served in the Israel Defense Forces's military theatre.

Career
Tal started her career after her military service, with a children's musical video tape in which she played an evil witch. Following that, she appeared in a commercial for a laundry detergent, and then appeared in the lead role in the Israeli film Lihiyot Kochav (To Be A Star).

During the filming of the movie Tal was offered two roles in two different Israeli television shows, and she took both. The first was a soap opera named Tzimerim, about the life of a family that runs a hotel; the second one was HaPijamot (The Pyjamas), a sitcom about a struggling band determined to make it in the real world. She took part in the first three seasons and later took part as a guest star which gave her the chance to show her musical talent. Although she was the main character only in the first three seasons, she appeared in the fourth season for several episodes.

Tal also appeared in the music video for "Final Warning", by Skylar Grey.

Tal moved to New York City, where she met singer Wyclef Jean and recorded a song with him (the song "Party to Damascus" has Tal singing the chorus in Hebrew).

She landed a role on Veronica Mars, that of Meg Manning, one of Veronica Mars's few friends. She also played the recurring role Jo Harvelle on the second, fifth, and seventh seasons of Supernatural. Tal also guest-starred on the series finale of Monk as Adrian Monk's stepdaughter, Molly Evans. In 2010, she performed the voice of Catherine-B320 (also known as Kat) in the video game Halo: Reach. In 2013, she starred in the mystery series Cult. She played the role of "Sonya" in the seventh and final season of Burn Notice.

In November 2020, Tal was cast as Ivy in the second season of the drama series Truth be Told.

Personal life
On March 23, 2005, Tal married American actor Marcos A. Ferraez. Tal announced on October 23, 2016, at a Supernatural panel that she was expecting her first child. She celebrated her pregnancy with a baby shower on January 29, 2017. Guests included fellow Israeli actresses Gal Gadot and Noa Tishby. She has two daughters, born in March 2017 and September 2022.

Filmography

Film

Television

Video games

References

External links

 
 

1983 births
American television actresses
Israeli emigrants to the United States
Israeli people of Polish-Jewish descent
Israeli people of Turkish-Jewish descent
21st-century Israeli women singers
Israeli film actresses
Israeli television actresses
Jewish Israeli actresses
Jewish American actresses
Jewish American musicians
Living people
People from Herzliya
Israeli female military personnel
21st-century American actresses
American film actresses
Israeli Ashkenazi Jews
Israeli Sephardi Jews
Israeli Mizrahi Jews